Brahmanwada or Varwada is a village in Gujarat, India. It is located in the Unjha taluka of Mahesana district.

According to the 2011 census of India, the population of the village was 5,950.

Notable people

It is the birthplace of Jashodaben Modi, the wife of Prime Minister of India Narendra Modi.

References

Villages in Mehsana district